Bačice is a municipality and village in Třebíč District in the Vysočina Region of the Czech Republic. It has about 200 inhabitants.

Administrative parts
The village of Udeřice is an administrative part of Bačice.

References

Villages in Třebíč District